Allium nutans, English common name Siberian chives or blue chives, is a species of onion native to  European Russia, Kazakhstan, Mongolia, Tibet, Xinjiang, and Asiatic Russia (Altay Krai, Krasnoyarsk, Tuva, Western Siberia, Amur Oblast). It grows in wet meadows and other damp locations.

Umbels are spherical, with many pink to pale purple flowers.

References

nutans
Onions
Flora of temperate Asia
Flora of Russia
Plants described in 1753
Taxa named by Carl Linnaeus